The 2020 North American and Caribbean Senior Club Championship  were planned as the second edition of the North American and Caribbean Senior Club Championship which is a qualifying tournament for the 2020 IHF Super Globe. It was supposed to be held in Lake Placid, United States at the United States Olympic Training Center from 16 to 20 June 2020.

Due to COVID-19 the tournament was cancelled.

Venue
The championship would have been played in Lake Placid, at the United States Olympic Training Center (LPOTC).

Teams

Following teams were already qualified for the tournament.

References

2020
North American and Caribbean Senior Club Championship
North American and Caribbean Senior Club Championship
International handball competitions hosted by the United States
North American and Caribbean Senior Club Championship
Handball events cancelled due to the COVID-19 pandemic